A basic income is a form of social security in which a population group receives a regular sum of money, either from a government or from some other public institution, independent of any other income. This is a list of alternates to universal basic income that intends to give all citizens of a population an unconditional sum of money, which have been implemented or proposed.

References

Universal basic income